Páll Guðlaugsson (born 9 September 1958) is an Icelandic former footballer and current football coach. He was the coach of the Faroe Islands in his 1–0 victory against Austria, in his first official match. He is currently the coach of B68 Toftir after spending two and a half year as coach of TB Tvøroyri, the oldest football club of the Faroese football.

Manager
Updated 16 June 2016

includes only UEFA and FIFA official matches.

References

External links 
Páll Guðlaugsson on Faroesoccer.com

1958 births
Living people
Pall Gudlaugsson
Expatriate football managers in the Faroe Islands
Faroe Islands national football team managers
Pall Gudlaugsson
Icelandic expatriate football managers
Icelandic expatriate sportspeople in the Faroe Islands